Necepsia is a plant genus of the family Euphorbiaceae first described as a genus in 1910. It is native to Madagascar and to tropical Africa.

Species
 Necepsia afzelii Prain - Liberia, Sierra Leone, Ivory Coast, Ghana, Cameroon, Congo, Cabinda, Gabon
 Necepsia castaneifolia (Baill.) Bouchat & J.Léonard - Tanzania, Zimbabwe, Madagascar
 Necepsia zairensis Bouchat & J.Léonard - Congo, Zaire

References

Euphorbiaceae genera
Acalyphoideae
Flora of Africa